Chen Yi (born February 10, 2001) is a Chinese swimmer. She won a gold medal at the Mixed 4x50meter freestyle relay-20 Points event at the 2016 Summer Paralympics, where she swam in the heats (with a time of 28.91) but not in the final race, where the team won with 2:18.03. She also won a silver medal at the Women's 100 metre Butterfly S10 event with 1:06.92 a bronze medal at the Women's 50m Freestyle S10 event with 28.21 and another bronze medal at the Women's 4 × 100 m Freestyle Relay - 34 Points event with a personal time of 1:02.16 and a total team time of 4:24.22.

References

Living people
Swimmers at the 2016 Summer Paralympics
Medalists at the 2016 Summer Paralympics
Paralympic gold medalists for China
Paralympic silver medalists for China
Paralympic bronze medalists for China
Paralympic swimmers of China
S10-classified Paralympic swimmers
Chinese female butterfly swimmers
Chinese female freestyle swimmers
2001 births
Paralympic medalists in swimming
21st-century Chinese women